Samuel LaFort Collins (August 6, 1895 – June 26, 1965) was an American lawyer, World War I veteran, and Republican politician who served in various offices from California in the early 20th century.

Early life and education 
Collins was born in Fortville, Indiana, attended public schools in Indiana and California, and graduated from Chaffey Union High School, Ontario, California, in 1915.

He served as a private in the Hospital Corps, Seventh Infantry, California National Guard on the Mexican border in 1916.

World War I service 
From 1917 to 1919, he served in the United States Army overseas as a sergeant in Co. C, 364th Infantry, 91st Division. After discharge from the Army, Collins studied law, was admitted to the bar in 1921, and practiced in Fullerton, California.

Legal career
He was assistant district attorney of Orange County, California, 1926–1930 and district attorney 1930–1932.

Political career 
In 1932 Collins was elected to the 73rd Congress, and reelected, serving during 1933–1937. He lost his bid for reelection to a third term in 1936.

Collins served as member of the California State Assembly for the 75th district from 1941 to 1953, serving as speaker 1947–1952.  Collins was the longest-serving Speaker in California history until the record was broken by Jesse M. Unruh, who was speaker from 1961 to 1969.  Collins is the fifth-longest-serving Speaker behind Leo T. McCarthy (1974–1980), Anthony Rendon (2016-2023), Unruh, and Willie Brown (1980–1995).  Collins is the longest-serving Republican Speaker.

After serving in the Assembly, he resumed the practice of law.

Death
Collins died at the age of 69 in Fullerton and is buried at Loma Vista Memorial Park.

References

External links

1895 births
1965 deaths
Speakers of the California State Assembly
Republican Party members of the California State Assembly
United States Army soldiers
United States Army personnel of World War I
People from Fullerton, California
People from Ontario, California
American Disciples of Christ
People from Hancock County, Indiana
Republican Party members of the United States House of Representatives from California
20th-century American politicians